Vejen Art Museum is an art gallery in Vejen Municipality in the south of Jutland, Denmark. It specializes in works from the end of the 19th century in styles including Symbolism and Art Nouveau.

Created in 1924 to house the works of sculptor and ceramist  Niels Hansen Jacobsen (1861–1941), it also displays works by Einar August Nielsen (1872–1956)  Jens Lund (1871–1924), Thorvald Bindesbøll (1846–1908), Harald Slott-Møller (1864-1937) and many others.  The original museum building was designed by the local builder, Niels Ebbesen Grue (1879-1937). The museum has been expanded several times, the first time in 1938 and again in   1959. The gallery corridor was inaugurated in 1975.

Niels Hansen Jacobsen was most noted  for creating the once controversial sculpture, Trold, der vejrer kristenblod.  In 1923, a copy of  the  bronze sculpture was erected in front of the Vejen Art Museum.

References

External links
Vejen Art Museum website (in Danish)

Museums in the Region of Southern Denmark
1924 establishments in Denmark
Art museums and galleries in Denmark
Museums established in 1924
Tourist attractions in the Region of Southern Denmark